Swadhinata Chikitshak Parishad aka SWACHIP is an organisation of pro-Awami League doctors of Bangladesh. M Iqbal Arslan is the president and M A Aziz is  the incumbent general secretary of the organisation since 2015.

History 
SWACHIP was formed on 24 December 1993 as a retaliation to formation of Doctors' Association of Bangladesh (DAB), a pro-BNP organisation. Prof. M A Qadri was made president and Mostofa Jalal Mohiuddin was the secretary. In 2003, in its national conference  Prof. AFM Ruhal Haque and Prof. M Iqbal Arslan was elected as president and secretary respectively. In 2015, M Iqbal Arslan was electes as president while M A Aziz was elected as secretary general of the organisation.

In 2016, The Daily Star published a report that alleged a syndicate of SWACHIP at National Institute of Ophthalmology and Hospital were prescribing expensive lenses in return for commission for doctors. In 2020, SWACHIP and Bangladesh Medical Association demanded the appointment of doctor as head of Central Medical Stores Depot. They criticized the appointment of a administration cadre from the civil service in the post.

Organisation 
According to SWACHIP's constitution, a committee is elected for two-year term by a national conference. But only four national conferences had been held since SWACHIP's inception. SWACHIP also has institutional and regional branches all over the country. 151 members form the central committee of SWACHIP. It has more than 13000 members all over the country.

References 

1993 establishments in Bangladesh
Organisations based in Dhaka
Bangladesh Awami League